Anthony M. Monaco (born August 14, 1959) is an American jazz organist.

Biography
Monaco played accordion from childhood and was heavily influenced by Jimmy Smith in his youth. In 1971, he switched to organ after hearing Smith play the instrument, and later received personal mentoring from Smith. In the early 2000s, he recorded his debut album in collaboration with Joey DeFrancesco, A New Generation: Paesanos on the New B3 which reached No. 18 on Jazzweek's Top 100 for the year 2003, and began releasing material on Summit Records. 
 
Monaco's career continued in the 2000s with frequent touring and performances with guitarist Pat Martino. Down Beat International Critics Poll placed Monaco in the top 5 jazz organists for the years 2005–2011.
His most commercially successful album was East to West which reached No. 4 on Jazzweek's Top 100 for the year 2006.

Monaco is also noted for his efforts in jazz education and holds the position Artist in Residence in Music at Hope College.

Playing style and critical reception
Monaco's work, along with several contemporaries, is associated with a minor resurgence of "Chitlin' Circuit" style jazz.

Discography

As leader
 The Monacos Are Moving Up (Blue Ash Records, 1976) with The Monaco Family
 Continentale Disco (The Monacos in Europe) (Blue Ash Records, 1979) with The Monaco Family
 Getting in Touch! (Light 'n Jazzy 103.9fm WBBY, 1989)
 Out of Nowhere (1999) Tony Monaco Organ Trio with Joey DeFrancesco (piano/trumpet), Paul Bollenback (guitar), Byron "Wookie" Landham (drums)
 Burnin' Grooves (Summit, 2001)
 Master Chops 'T'  (Summit, 2002)
 Intimately Live at the 501 (Summit, 2002) 
 A New Generation: Paesanos on the New B3 (Summit, 2003) with Joey DeFrancesco
 Fiery Blues (Summit, 2004)
 East to West (Summit, 2006) with Bruce Forman
 Live at the Orbit Room (Summit, 2008) Tony and his Toronto Trio with Ted Quinlin, Vito Rezza
 Celebration: Life, Love, Music (Summit, 2012) with Joey DeFrancesco
 Live at Cotton Club Japan (Mocloud, 2013) with Yosuke Onuma, Gene Jackson
 New Adventures (TMHP, 2014) with Howard R. Paul, Jim Rupp
 Groove: Blue (Q-Rious, 2015) with Vinny Valentino, Steve Smith
 Furry Slippers (Summit, 2015)
 At One (Mocloud, 2016) with Yosuke Onuma, Gene Jackson
 The Definition of Insanity (Summit, 2019)
 The Keys of Cool (RCP, 2019) with Richie Cole
 Strollin'  (Reid Hoyson Productions, 2021) with Hendrik Meurkens, Reid Hoyson, Mark Lucas
 Four Brothers (Summit, 2022) with Kevin Turner, Eddie Bayard, Willie Barthell III

As sideman
 Moanin' , Nancy Wright (Summit, 2009)
 A Night in Jazz, Ray Mantilla (M.M.C. Produzioni s.r.l., 2010)
 Undeniable: Live at Blues Alley, Pat Martino (HighNote, 2011)

References

External links
 Official site
 
 Tony Monaco at JazzTimes
 Tony Monaco at AllAboutJazz

Soul-jazz organists
American jazz organists
American male organists
Hard bop organists
American jazz educators
1959 births
Living people
Jazz musicians from Ohio
21st-century organists
21st-century American male musicians
American male jazz musicians
21st-century American keyboardists
Summit Records artists